Lewis Howard "Hicks" Moren (August 4, 1883 – November 2, 1966) was a Major League Baseball pitcher. He pitched six seasons from 1903 to 1910: two seasons with the Pittsburgh Pirates and four seasons with the Philadelphia Phillies. In 1908, Moren was credited by the New York Press for inventing the knuckleball; however Eddie Cicotte is today more often cited as the inventor of the pitch.  Moren retired with a career record of 48 wins, 57 losses, and a 2.95 earned run average.

Moren committed suicide in Pittsburgh, Pennsylvania by slitting his throat.

See also

List of knuckleball pitchers

References

External links

1883 births
1966 suicides
Major League Baseball pitchers
Pittsburgh Pirates players
Philadelphia Phillies players
Atlanta Crackers players
Jersey City Skeeters players
Duquesne Dukes baseball players
Knuckleball pitchers
Baseball players from Pittsburgh
Suicides by sharp instrument in the United States
Suicides in Pennsylvania
Burials at Homewood Cemetery
1966 deaths